Sunar Sulaiman (born in Ujungpandang, South Sulawesi 29 December 1979) is an Indonesian footballer. He normally plays as a defender, but he also plays goal.

Career
Sunar Sulaiman was a member of the Indonesian Senior Team at the Kemerdekaan Cup in 2000.

He is also a former member of the Indonesia U-23 Team; the team won 4th Place at the 2001 Southeast Asian Games, losing 0–1 to the  Myanmar U-23 Team.  The event was held at Kuala Lumpur, Malaysia.

While with Arema Malang he helped the club win two consecutive Piala Indonesia Cups (2005 and 2006). In August 2007 he left Arema and moved to Persela Lamongan. He is currently with Persita Tangerang.

He played for Arema Malang in the 2007 AFC Champions League group stage.

References

Indonesian footballers
1979 births
Living people
Association football defenders
Arema F.C. players
Sportspeople from Makassar